Louis Licherie de Beurie (6 July 1629, Nesle-Hodeng - 3 December 1687, Paris) was a French painter and engraver in the Baroque style. He specialized in Biblical and historical scenes.

Life and works
He was originally a student of Louis Boullogne. In 1666, he found employment as a member of the workshop of Charles Le Brun, the Premier peintre du Roi, who was responsible for all the grand decorations created during the reign of King Louis XIV. The following year, he was appointed Director of the drawing and design school at the Gobelins Manufactory, whose Chief Director was Le Brun. He held that position until 1670.

He became a member of the Académie royale de peinture et de sculpture in 1679. His reception piece was a scene depicting Abigail bringing gifts to King David, which is now preserved at the École nationale supérieure des Beaux-Arts. In 1681, he was named an Assistant Professor.

The catalog of his known works has grown considerably due to recent research.

References

Further reading 
Georges Guillet de Saint-George, Louis Licherie, Mémoires inédits…, Paris, 1855  
Émile Bellier de La Chavignerie, "Recherches sur Louis Licherie, peintre normand, membre de l’ancienne Académie royale de peinture et de sculpture (1629-1687)", in Mémoires de la Société des Beaux-Arts de Caen, 1860 
Jacques Thuillier, "Un tableau de Louis Licherie, le Saint Louis soignant ses soldats atteints de la peste", in Revue du Louvre et des Musées de France, #6, 1969, p. 347-354
 C. Goldstein, "Theory and Practice in the French Academy : Louis Licherie’s ’Abigail and David’", in  The Burlington Magazine, Vol. 111, No. 795 (Jun., 1969), p. 346–351.

External links 

1629 births
1687 deaths
French painters
Religious artists
French history painters
People from Seine-Maritime